Federico Iván "Fede" Rasic (born 24 March 1992) is an Argentine footballer, playing as a forward for Chacarita Juniors. He also holds Croatian citizenship. He has been called up for the Croatia national football team.

Club career
In December 2013, Rasic attracted interest from Spartak Moscow and Dynamo Kyiv, before signing a six-month loan deal with Amkar Perm, with the option to make it permanent. Rasic failed to make an appearance for Amkar Perm and returned to Gimnasia y Esgrima upon its expiration.

At the beginning of August 2014, Rasic was joined Arsenal de Sarandí on loan for 18-months.

On 19 January 2017, he signed a contract with the Russian Premier League club FC Arsenal Tula.

Career statistics

Club

References

External links

1992 births
Sportspeople from Mar del Plata
Argentine people of Croatian descent
Living people
Argentine footballers
Association football forwards
Club de Gimnasia y Esgrima La Plata footballers
FC Amkar Perm players
Arsenal de Sarandí footballers
FC Arsenal Tula players
Pafos FC players
Karmiotissa FC players
Chacarita Juniors footballers
Primera B Metropolitana players
Argentine Primera División players
Russian Premier League players
Serie D players
Cypriot First Division players
Cypriot Second Division players
Paraguayan Primera División players
Argentine expatriate footballers
Expatriate footballers in Russia
Argentine expatriate sportspeople in Russia
Expatriate footballers in Cyprus
Argentine expatriate sportspeople in Cyprus
Expatriate footballers in Italy
Argentine expatriate sportspeople in Italy
Expatriate footballers in Paraguay
Argentine expatriate sportspeople in Paraguay